Ronald David Vale (born 1959) is a biochemist and cell biologist. He is a professor at the Department of Cellular and Molecular Pharmacology, University of California, San Francisco. His research is focused on motor proteins, particularly kinesin and dynein. He was awarded the 
Canada Gairdner International Award for Biomedical Research in 2019, the Shaw Prize in Life Science and Medicine in 2017 together with Ian Gibbons, and the Albert Lasker Award for Basic Medical Research in 2012 alongside Michael Sheetz and James Spudich. He is a fellow of the American Academy of Arts and Sciences and a member of the National Academy of Sciences. He was the president of the American Society for Cell Biology in 2012. He has also been an investigator at the Howard Hughes Medical Institute since 1995. In 2019, Vale was named executive director of the Janelia Research Campus and a vice president of HHMI, his appointment began in early 2020.

Early life and education 
Vale was born in Hollywood, California. His mother, Evelyn, was a former actress; his father, Eugene, was a novelist and screenwriter. He finished high school at Hollywood High School. For his grade 10 science project, he set up a laboratory at the basement of his home to investigate the circadian rhythm of bean plants. His guidance counselor contacted Karl Hammer at the University of California, Los Angeles, who allowed Vale to continue his experiments at his laboratory. His guidance counselor also encouraged Vale to submit his work to the Westinghouse Science Talent Search (now the Regeneron Science Talent Search), where he was selected as one of the top 40 students in the US.

Vale is a first-generation university student. He entered the College of Creative Studies, University of California, Santa Barbara, and earned a bachelor's degree in chemistry and biology in 1980. During his study, he first worked at the laboratory of C. Fred Fox at UCLA, then at Robert Lefkowitz's group at Duke University, earning him two articles published in 1984 and 1982, respectively.

In 1980, Vale entered an MD/PhD program at Stanford University, supervised by Eric Shooter, where he studied the nerve growth factor receptor (also known as the neurotrophic factor receptor).

Vale obtained his PhD in neuroscience in 1985. He then spent one year as an NIH staff scientist in Tom Reese's laboratory at the Marine Biological Laboratory at Woods Hole, MA.

Scientific career 
While working on Nerve growth factor (NGF) receptors as a graduate student, Vale became interested in exploring the mechanism of how receptors and other molecules are transported in nerve axons. He then heard of the research of Michael Sheetz and James Spudich, who used a video camera on a microscope to film myosin-coated beads moving along actin filaments. In 1983, Vale and Sheetz decided to test whether the movement of myosin on actin was the source for organelle transport in axons, using the squid giant axon as a model. However, since no squid were caught that year at Stanford's Hopkins Marine Station, following Shooter's approval, they went to the Marine Biological Laboratory instead.

At the Marine Biological Laboratory, Vale and Sheetz teamed up with Bruce Schnapp and Thomas J. Reese. They found that membrane organelle transport occurred bidirectionally on a microtubule, and not actin filament as Vale had originally thought. Vale further demonstrated that purified organelles by themselves rarely moved on microtubules, but movement was observed after adding the cytosol of the axon.  He then discovered serendipitously that cytosol caused microtubules to translocate along a glass surface.  Similarly, he found that cytosol-coated beads moved along microtubules. These two phenomena provided assays to study microtubule-based motility assay in vitro. In 1985, Vale, Sheetz and Reese isolated the dominant motor protein in the cytosol, naming it "kinesin." They showed that kinesin only moved in one direction towards the plus ends of microtubules  and a second motor (later shown to be dynein by Richard Vallee) moved in the opposite direction. The results of Vale and colleagues on axonal transport were published in five papers in 1985.

Vale did not finish his MD, and joined the University of California, San Francisco as an assistant professor in 1986. He was promoted to associate professor in 1992 and then to full professor in 1994. In 1989, Vale, with Jonathan Howard and A. James Hudspeth developed a single molecular assay for kinesin.  In 1991, he discovered the first protein that severed microtubules and later purified and named it katanin. In 1996, Vale and colleagues solved the crystal structure of the kinesin motor domain. and discovered unexpectedly that it is structurally similar to myosin. In that same year, working with Toshio Yanagida, Vale developed a single-molecule fluorescence assay for kinesin. In 1999, using various techniques, Vale and co-workers developed a mechanical model for how the two motor domains of the kinesin dimer walk in a “hand-over-hand” model along a microtubule.

Since 2003, Vale has focused on dynein, a motor protein discovered by Ian R. Gibbons in 1965. Although its discovery occurred 20 years before kinesin, its large size hampered its investigation. In 2006, Vale's laboratory prepared recombinant dynein from yeast, and elucidated how it walked on microtubules using single-molecule microscopy. He then worked with Gibbons to determine the structure of the dynein microtubule-binding domain. His team also solved the structure of the dynein motor domain. Vale has extended his research to other fields, including T-cell signalling and RNA biology.

Outreach 
Vale founded iBiology in 2006, a non-profit organization that produces and disseminates free online videos by leading biologists, speaking about biological principles and their research, and scientific training and professional development for practicing scientists. Vale recently founded and produced The Explorer's Guide to Biology (XBio), a free online undergraduate "textbook" that provides a storytelling and discover-focused approach to learning biology.

Between 2004 and 2008, Vale and Tim Mitchison co-directed the Physiology Course at the Marine Biological Laboratory in Woods Hole, transforming it into an interdisciplinary training environment that brings together biologists, physicists and computational scientists.

In 2009, Vale established the Young Investigators' Meeting in India, which provides a mentoring and networking workshop for postdocs and junior faculty in India. He founded ASAPbio (Accelerating Science and Publication in Biology) in 2015, promoting the use of preprints and an open and transparent peer-review process.  Also in 2009, Vale founded the Bangalore Microscopy Course, held at the National Centre for Biological Research, which provides international training in light microscopy. He also organized an online microscopy course through iBiology.

Nico Stuurman and Vale  also conceived of and developed Micro-Manager, a free and open-source microscopy software that was supported for many years through the Vale laboratory and now operates through the University of Wisconsin.

Awards and honours
 American Chemical Society, Pfizer Award in Enzyme Chemistry (1991)
 Member of the National Academy of Sciences (2001)
 Fellow of the American Academy of Arts and Sciences (2002)
 American Society for Cell Biology, Keith R. Porter Lecture Award (2009)
 Wiley Prize in Biomedical Sciences (2012)
 Albert Lasker Award for Basic Medical Research (2012)
 Associate Member of the European Molecular Biology Organization (2012)
 Meira and Shaul G. Massry Foundation, Massry Prize (2013)
 Member of the National Academy of Medicine (formerly Institute of Medicine) (2014)
 Foreign Fellow of the Indian National Science Academy (2015)
 Shaw Prize in Life Science and Medicine (2017)
 Canada Gairdner International Award (2019)

References

External links

Living people
1959 births
American biochemists
Howard Hughes Medical Investigators
University of California, San Francisco faculty
Recipients of the Albert Lasker Award for Basic Medical Research
Members of the United States National Academy of Sciences
Massry Prize recipients
Foreign Fellows of the Indian National Science Academy
Members of the National Academy of Medicine